Nico Marvin Monien (born 8 April 1990 in Berlin) is a German racing driver.

Career

ADAC Formel Masters
Despite beginning his karting career in 2006, 2008 saw his debut in the ADAC Formel Masters championship with URD Rennsport. Monien finished as runner-up in the championship with two wins at TT Circuit Assen and Motorsport Arena Oschersleben.

Formula Three
In 2009, Monien stepped up to the German Formula Three Championship with Zettl Sportsline. He finished fifth in the standings after taking six podium places, including a win at EuroSpeedway Lausitz. Also he appeared as a guest driver for Mücke Motorsport at the Formula 3 Euro Series finale at Hockenheim.

Racing record

Career summary

† - As Monien was a guest driver, he was ineligible for points.

References

External links
 Official website 
 

German racing drivers
1990 births
Living people
Sportspeople from Berlin
ADAC Formel Masters drivers
German Formula Three Championship drivers
Formula 3 Euro Series drivers
Mücke Motorsport drivers